The 2012 Oklahoma Sooners football team represented the University of Oklahoma in the 2012 NCAA Division I FBS football season, the 118th season of Sooner football. The team was led by two-time Walter Camp Coach of the Year Award winner, Bob Stoops, in his 14th season as head coach. They played their home games at Gaylord Family Oklahoma Memorial Stadium in Norman, Oklahoma. They were a charter member of the Big 12 Conference.

Conference play began with an upset loss at home to the Kansas State Wildcats on September 22 and concluded with a win against the TCU Horned Frogs in Fort Worth, Texas on December 1. The Sooners finished the regular season with a 10–2 record overall (8–1 in the Big 12), and shared the Big 12 Conference championship with K-State to win their eighth Big 12 title and 44th conference title overall. They faced former Big 12 member Texas A&M in the Cotton Bowl Classic, where they lost, 13–41. The Sooners were also the first team since Florida in 1993 to play against the top 3 Heisman vote-getters in the same season: Collin Klein of Kansas State, Manti Te'o of Notre Dame, and Johnny Manziel of Texas A&M (the Sooners only 3 losses on the season).

Following the season, Lane Johnson was selected 4th overall in the 2013 NFL Draft, along with Landry Jones in the 4th round, Kenny Stills in the 5th, Justin Brown and Stacy McGee in the 6th, and David King in the 7th.

Recruits

Schedule

Roster

Game summaries

UTEP

Florida A&M

Kansas State

Texas Tech

Texas (Red River Rivalry)

Kansas

Notre Dame

Iowa State

Baylor

West Virginia

Oklahoma State (Bedlam Series)

TCU

Texas A&M (Cotton Bowl)

Rankings

Statistics

Team

Scores by quarter

Post Season

All Big 12 team
A number of Sooners were named to the All Big 12 Team.

2013 NFL Draft

The 2013 NFL Draft was held on April 25–27, 2013 at Radio City Music Hall in New York City. The following Oklahoma players were either selected or signed as free agents following the draft.

References

External links
 

Oklahoma
Oklahoma Sooners football seasons
Big 12 Conference football champion seasons
Oklahoma Sooners football